Sallis can refer to:

People
 Crispian Sallis (born 1959), British art director, son of Peter
 James Sallis (born 1944), American writer
 John Sallis (born 1938), American philosopher
 Peter Sallis (1921–2017), English actor

Fictional people
 Dr. Theodore "Ted" Sallis, the Man-Thing, a fictional character in Marvel Comics

Places
 Sallis, Mississippi
 Sallis (ruin)